Samapika Debnath is an Indian film  and television actress and model. She has mainly acted in Bengali and Hindi films. She made her debut in 2007 with film Kaal.

Works

Films 
 Astra (2012)
 Riwayat (2012)
 Shatru Sanghar (2009)
 Hello Kolkata (2008)
 Kaal

Television 
 Kolkata Cocktail
 Channel VJ
 Anchoring in Sangeet Bangla

References

External links 
 
 

Living people
21st-century Indian actresses
Indian television actresses
Indian film actresses
Bengali television actresses
Actresses in Bengali cinema
Bengali female models
Place of birth missing (living people)
Year of birth missing (living people)
Actresses in Hindi cinema